The Interstate Association was a minor league baseball league that played briefly in the 1906 season. The eight–team, Class C level Interstate Association consisted of franchises based in Indiana, Ohio and Michigan. The Interstate League played a portion 1906 season before permanently folding.

History
The Interstate Association began play in the 1906 season, formed as a Class C level league, with Emerson W. Dickinson serving as league president.

The 1906 Interstate Association was an eight–team league that began play on April 26, 1906. The league was formed with teams representing Anderson, Indiana, Bay City, Michigan, Flint, Michigan (Flint Vehicles), Fort Wayne, Indiana (Fort Wayne Railroaders), Lima, Ohio (Lima Lees), Marion, Indiana (Marion Moguls). Muncie, Indiana, (Muncie Fruit Jars) and Saginaw, Michigan teams beginning play on April 26, 1906. During the season, Muncie and Bay city were disbanded on May 18, Saginaw moved to Marion, Ohio on June 21 before folding and Flint disbanded on July 2, 1906. The Interstate Association, with four remaining teams, permanently disbanded on July 8, 1906.

The Fort Wayne Railroaders were in first place when the Buckeye League folded on July 8, 1906. Fort Wayne finished with a record of 37–22, playing under managers Louie Heilbroner and Jack Hardy. Fort Wayne was followed by the Marion (36–24,), Anderson (30–31) and Lima (26–36) in the final standings.

The Interstate Association did not reform as a minor league after folding in 1906.

Interstate Association teams

Standings & statistics

1906 Interstate Association 
Muncie and Bay city disbanded on May 18; Saginaw moved to Marion on June 21 before folding after three games; Flint disbanded July 2
League Disbanded July 8, 1906

References

Defunct minor baseball leagues in the United States
Baseball leagues in Ohio
Defunct professional sports leagues in the United States
Sports leagues established in 1906
Sports leagues disestablished in 1906
Baseball leagues in Michigan
Baseball leagues in Indiana